is a 2007 Japanese anime action adventure fantasy film directed by Takahiro Imamura and written by Hirohiko Kamisama. It is the eighth film in the One Piece media franchise, adapting a story arc from the original manga by Eiichiro Oda, wherein the Straw Hat Pirates travel to the Kingdom of Alabasta to save the war-and drought-plagued country from Sir Crocodile and his secret crime syndicate Baroque Works. The events of the film take place during the ninth season of One Piece as 2-Parts of the thirteenth story arcs, "Enies Lobby".

In Japan, the film was released on March 3, 2007, where it was shown alongside the Dr. Slump short Dr. Mashirito and Abale-chan. It peaked at second place of the weekend box office and grossed $7,075,924. Worldwide, the film has grossed a total of $7,090,891. The film was briefly shown at select theaters across the United States, before it was released on DVD in North America on February 19, 2008, and the Blu-ray released on January 27, 2009.

Plot
In a brief flashback, Nefeltari Vivi is shown flying with Pell. Returning to the present, Vivi and the Straw Hats meet Crocodile's subordinate Mr. 2 Bon Clay, who shows the Straw Hats his devil fruit ability, which allows him to assume the form and voice of anyone whose face he has touched.

Vivi describes a brief history on how the Baroque Works leader Crocodile has used Dance Powder while posing as the country's hero. He has also tricked the rebel and royal armies into fighting each other. Once in Alabasta and after crossing the desert, the Straw Hats find the rebel's base deserted, while the rebel army, led by Vivi's childhood friend Koza, witnesses the port town Nanohana being burned by members of Baroque Works disguised as soldiers of the royal army. The rebels decide to attack Alubarna, where at the same time Mr. 2 impersonates the king, Nefeltari Cobra, and orders the royal army to engage.

Meanwhile in the desert, the Straw Hats are intercepted by Crocodile and his partner Ms. All Sunday. Crocodile aims for Vivi, but Luffy stays behind and distracts him, while the other Straw Hats escape. In the ensuing fight, Crocodile defeats Luffy by impaling him through the chest with his hook and buried alive. The Straw Hats arrive at Alabasta's capital city, Alubarna, where the officer agents of Baroque Works are already waiting for them. The Straw Hats lure them into the city, allowing Vivi to try and stop the approaching rebels. Vivi's attempt fails and she rushes to the palace.

Meanwhile, Usopp and Chopper defeat the officer agents Mr. 4 and Miss Merry Christmas, while Sanji manages to defeat Mr. 2. Vivi finally reaches the palace and convinces the acting royal army captain, Chaka, to blow up the palace to make the fighting sides listen to her. However, Crocodile and Ms. All Sunday arrive and interfere with her plan. Back in the streets, Nami defeats Ms. Doublefinger and Zoro learns to cut steel by defeating the blade-bodied Mr. 1. Back at the palace, Koza witnesses Crocodile questioning Vivi's father who stands nailed to the wall, about the ancient weapon Pluton. He and Chaka attack Crocodile, but are quickly defeated.

With the two armies' leaders in his control, Crocodile engulfs the palace plaza in a sandstorm, making it even harder to stop the fighting. After that, he follows his partner and the king into the royal mausoleum. Luffy arrives and follows Crocodile. In the streets, Vivi and the remaining Straw Hats try to find a bomb set by Baroque Works to wipe out both armies. Luffy and Crocodile fight in the mausoleum. Crocodile hits Luffy with his poisonous hook, but Luffy is not stopped. The Straw Hats find the bomb, as well as Mr. 7 and Miss Father's Day in the city's clock tower. Vivi takes out the agents and prevents the bomb from being fired; however, Vivi discovers that the bomb has a timer. Pell arrives and supposedly sacrifices himself to save Alabasta.

Meanwhile in the mausoleum, an enraged Luffy breaks Crocodile's poisonous hook and defeats him. Back at the plaza, it begins to rain. With Chaka and Koza presenting the defeated Crocodile as the rebellion's orchestrator, the fighting stops. It rains for three days. After that, Luffy wakes up and a banquet is given for the pirates. News arrives that a marine fleet is on their way to Alabasta. The Straw Hats decide to leave as fast as possible, leaving Vivi with a choice. The next day, she appears at the coast, to say farewell to the crew. From there, Vivi uses a transponder snail to broadcast a speech through the country. Vivi asks whether she is still their friend, the Straw Hats show the sign of their friendship on their arms. In the end credits, Vivi finds Pell alive and peace eventually returns to Alabasta.

Cast 
Mayumi Tanaka/Colleen Clinkenbeard as Monkey D. Luffy
Kazuya Nakai/Christopher R. Sabat as Roronoa Zoro
Akemi Okamura/Luci Christian as Nami
Kappei Yamaguchi/Sonny Strait as Usopp
Hiroaki Hirata/Eric Vale as Sanji
Ikue Ohtani/Brina Palencia as Tony Tony Chopper
Misa Watanabe/Caitlin Glass as Nefertari Vivi
Ryūzaburō Ōtomo/John Swasey as Sir Crocodile (Mr. 0)
Yuriko Yamaguchi/Stephanie Young as Nico Robin (Miss All Sunday)
Iemasa Kayumi/Kyle Hebert as Nefertari Cobra
Takeshi Kusao/Todd Haberkorn as Koza
Kenji Nojima/Kevin M. Connolly as Pell
Kihachirō Uemura/Robert McCollum as Chaka
Kazuki Yao/Barry Yandell as Bon Clay (Mr. 2)
Tetsu Inada/Brett Weaver as Daz Bones (Mr. 1)
Yuko Tachibana/Leah Clark as Miss Doublefinger
Masaya Takatsuka/Scott Hinze as Mr. 4
Mami Kingetsu/Wendy Powell as Miss Merry Christmas
Keisuke/Anthony Bowling as Mr. 7
Tomoko Naka/Cynthia Cranz as Miss Father's Day
Keiichi Sonobe/Antimere Robinson as Terracotta
Takeshi Kusao/Mark Stoddard as Jaguar D. Saul
Takeshi Aono/Christopher Bevins as Lasso

Adaptations

Shueisha created two adaptations of the film: a film comic and a light novel, both titled . The film comic was released on March 4 and the light novel on March 7, 2007.

Soundtrack

The score on the film's soundtrack was composed by Kōhei Tanaka, Shiro Hamaguchi, Yasunori Iwasaki, Minoru Maruo and Kazuhiko Sawaguchi. The ending theme "Compass" was written and performed by Ai Kawashima. For the English release, the score was used, and an English remake of "Compass" was created for use in the English dub, but a defect in the DVD caused the Japanese version to play instead. However, the English version was used in the theatrical release as well as the Blu-ray release.

Reception
In its first week of showing, the film entered the Japanese weekend box office on place two. In its second and third week, it placed fourth and ninth, respectively, before falling out of the Top 10 the week after. In its fifth week of showing, the film re-entered the Top 10 for a final ninth place. In the Japanese market, the film's gross revenue summed up to $7,075,924. Including non-North American, foreign markets, the film made at total of $7,084,304 and after Funimation Entertainment's limited showing in the US, the figure rose to a worldwide total of $7,090,891.

Funimation Entertainment's DVD and Blu-ray releases of the film were also the subject of several reviews by a number of publications for films and anime. Carl Kimlinger of Anime News Network described the film as "a feature-length recap with slightly revised editing and a heavy layer of theatrical gloss" that is "Squeezing an enormous plot into a teeny little film like a man in mid-life crisis trying to squeeze into high-school jeans", but noted that "The soundtrack is a joy to listen to, rousing and fun". Bamboo Dong, another reviewer of Anime News Network, said that the film's pace is "anything but smooth" and that the battles are "cobbled together". She commented that the film is "syrupy good fun" for those who are fans of the series, but noted that for non-fans it will hold only "limited appeal". Although Todd Douglass Jr. of DVD talk said that "you really have to be affirmed in One Piece lore in order to full  appreciate [it]" and commented that it felt "incomplete and unbalanced", he still recommended the film, stating that it is "short on story but ... a lot of fun." In regard to Funimation Entertainment's adaptation, he said that "[their] team does a great job of capturing the spirit and personalities of the show's characters."

Bryce Coulter of Mania Entertainment said that the film "cannot be recommended for someone who is not familiar with the series" but otherwise recommends it, cautiously, while commenting that it gives "a neat perspective" on its source material, but ultimately does not do it "any justice". In reference to the English adaptation he said that "the ... voice actors ... did a great job of portraying the Japanese cast." Davey C. Jones of Active Anime said that he liked the animation, in particular the backgrounds, and commented that the film "takes the character designs right out of the manga and TV show and ups them with theatrical quality shine." N.S. Davidson of IGN rated the film with 7 out of 10, stating that the animation is only "Slightly more sophisticated ... than in the television series" and that the film itself is "most likely ... for One Piece fans only." Dustin Somner of Blu-ray.com agreed on the film being primarily for fans, stating that the film's lack of context makes it "frustrating (with a capital 'F')" for those unfamiliar with the series.

References

External links
Official website of Toei Animation 
Official website  of Funimation Entertainment

2007 anime films
Funimation
Desert Princess and the Pirates: Adventure in Alabasta, The
Toei Animation films
Films scored by Kohei Tanaka
Films scored by Shirō Hamaguchi